Epipremnum amplissimum is a species of flowering plant in the genus Epipremnum.  native to Southeast Asia, from New Guinea to Vanuatu including northern Australia. 

Like the more commonly known Epipremnum aureum (Pothos), it is an evergreen vine typically on a tree as an epiphyte. Unlike the fenestrations of Epipremnum pinnatum, this species does not develop dramatically new leaf shapes when climbing, with young foliage having a narrow elliptic shape and then increasing in length and breadth as it grows. The plant is most commonly kept in cultivation in its juvenile state, where it may have blue-gray variegation that disappears with maturity.

References

amplissimum
Flora of New Guinea
Flora of Vanuatu
Flora of Australia
Plants described in 1880